Acanthodoris rhodoceras is a species of sea slug, a dorid nudibranch, a shell-less marine gastropod mollusc in the family Onchidorididae.

Distribution 
This species was described from Dead Man's Island, San Pedro, California. It has been reported from Umpqua River, Oregon south to Bahía de los Ángeles, Gulf of California, Mexico. Specimens from Pillar Point, San Mateo County; Ellwood Boulder Field, Santa Barbara County and Hazard Canyon, San Luis Obispo County have been sequenced for the 16S ribosomal RNA, Histone H3 and CO1 genes.

References

Onchidorididae
Gastropods described in 1905